Henry Stonex (18 May 1823 – 10 January 1897) was a composer and organist based in Great Yarmouth.

Life

He was born in Norwich on 18 May 1823 to Rowland Stonex and Mary Bridgman.

He married Mary Tilney Bassett (d. 1882), daughter of Henry Bassett of Heigham, on 16 January 1851 and had the following children:
Mary Gertrude Stonex (b. 21 Mar 1852)
Henry Bassett Stonex (b. 4 Sep 1853, d. 1923)  
Florence Tilney Stonex (b. 1855)
Canon Francis Stonex (b. 28 Sep 1857)
Edward Claude Stonex (b. 22 Dec 1858)
Edith Bassett Stonex (b. 4 Jan 1860)
Alfred Herbert Stonex (1862 - 1863)
Blanche Lillian Stonex (b. 1863)

He studied organ under James Harcourt at St Peter Mancroft, and then was apprenticed to Zechariah Buck at Norwich Cathedral.

Whilst in Great Yarmouth he conducted the Yarmouth Musical Society for many years.

He died in 1897 in Great Yarmouth.

Appointments

Organist at St. Nicholas' Church, Great Yarmouth,  1850 - 1894

Compositions

He is best known for his psalm chant which is still widely used in Anglican churches to this day, and has been recorded frequently.

References

1823 births
1897 deaths
English organists
British male organists
English composers
Musicians from Norwich
19th-century British composers
19th-century English musicians
19th-century British male musicians
People from Great Yarmouth
19th-century organists